Events in the year 1858 in Norway.

Incumbents
Monarch: Oscar I

Events
14 April – The 1858 Christiania fire. Several city blocks were destroyed, 41 buildings burned down, and around 1,000 persons lost their homes.

Arts and literature

Births

January to June
7 January – Andreas Kaddeland, physician and politician
17 February – Hans Georg Jacob Stang, politician and Minister (died 1907)
7 April – Haaken L. Mathiesen, landowner and businessperson (died 1930)
19 April – Oddmund Vik, politician (died 1930)
 9 May  Hanna Hoffmann, sculptor and silversmith (born 1917)
10 May – Schak Bull, architect (died 1956)
27 June – Magne Johnsen Rongved, politician (died 1933)

July to December
27 August – Per Winge, conductor, pianist and composer (died 1935)
24 September – Christian Meidell Kahrs, businessperson and politician
28 October – Nordal Wille, botanist (died 1924)
29 October – Christian Bendz Kielland, civil servant (died 1934)
26 December – Torolf Prytz, architect, goldsmith and politician (died 1938)

Full date unknown
Christian Bjelland I, businessperson (died 1927)
Gunder Anton Johannesen Jahren, politician and Minister (died 1933)
Vetle Vislie, educationalist and writer (died 1933)

Deaths
10 June – Peter Hersleb Harboe Castberg, priest and politician (born 1794)
11 June – Hans Conrad Thoresen, priest and politician (born 1802)

See also

References